Susanne "Susi" Giebisch (born 7 January 1930) is an Austrian former pair skater. Competing with Hellmut Seibt, she finished 11th at the 1948 Winter Olympics. She later competed with Rudi Seeliger, and the pair won the gold medal at the Austrian Figure Skating Championships in 1950.

Results

Pairs with Seeliger

Pairs with Seibt

Ladies' singles

References

External links
 Susi Giebisch's profile at Sports Reference.com

Austrian female pair skaters
Olympic figure skaters of Austria
Figure skaters at the 1948 Winter Olympics
1930 births
Possibly living people